Telethrio is a small mountain range in the northwestern part of the island of Euboea, Greece. Its maximum elevation is 970 m. It stretches along the west coast of the island, on the North Euboean Gulf, from Aidipsos in the west to Rovies in the east. Its length is about 16 km from east to west. The mountain is forested. There are few villages on the steep southern slope, including Ilia. Villages on the northern slope are Taxiarchis, Kastaniotissa, Galatsades, Kamatriades and Simia.

References

Euboea
Mountain ranges of Greece
Landforms of Central Greece
Landforms of Euboea (regional unit)